Cyathophora may refer to:
 Euphorbia cyathophora, a plant sometimes called Fire on the mountain
 Cyathophora (genus), a prehistoric genus of Hexacorallia